Rik Wouters (born 5 August 1942) is a Dutch racing cyclist. He rode in the 1964 Tour de France.

References

External links
 

1942 births
Living people
Dutch male cyclists
Place of birth missing (living people)